29 Golden Bullets is the third compilation by the German hard rock band Bonfire. It was released in 2001 by BMG International and features a bonus song that was cut from the Fireworks album called "Take Me by the Hand". The album is a double CD that features the band's most recognized songs; some were remixed and others edited for radio airplay and all have been digitally remastered.

Track listing

CD 1

CD 2

Band members
(At the time of this release)
Claus Lessmann – lead vocals
Hans Ziller – guitars
Chris Lausmann – guitars, keyboards
Uwe Köhler – bass
Jürgen Wiehler – drums

References
 Billboard's Listing of 29 Golden Bullets Album

Bonfire (band) compilation albums
2001 compilation albums